The Alfred Dunhill Links Championship is one of the richest golf tournaments on the European Tour. It is played in September, on three different links courses, centred on the "home of golf", St Andrews in Fife, Scotland.

The tournament is a pro-am, with the format based on the long-running United States PGA Tour's AT&T Pebble Beach National Pro-Am held annually since 1937 (except during the Second World War), where each team consists of one amateur and one professional. The three course rotation consists of The Old Course at St Andrews, Carnoustie Golf Links and Kingsbarns Golf Links.

The 54-hole cut is made of the top 60 professionals and the leading 20 pro-am teams, regardless of the professional member of the team making the individual cut. These players and teams advance to the final round at St Andrews.

Originally called the Dunhill Links Championship, the event was introduced in 2001 as a replacement for the Alfred Dunhill Cup, a three-man team tournament which became marginalised when the long established World Cup of Golf was given enhanced status as part of the World Golf Championships in 2000, becoming the WGC-World Cup.

To increase interest in the event, many of the amateurs are well known personalities from the worlds of sport and entertainment. These have included Tico Torres Nigel Mansell, Ian Botham, Gary Lineker, Boris Becker, Michael Douglas, Samuel L. Jackson, Michael Vaughan, Matthew Pinsent, Hugh Grant, Justin Timberlake, Michael Phelps  and Shane Warne.

Winners

References

External links
Official site
Coverage on the European Tour's official site

European Tour events
Golf tournaments in Scotland
Pro–am golf tournaments
Sport in Fife
Sport in Angus, Scotland
Recurring sporting events established in 2001
2001 establishments in Scotland